Guy Berthiaume  (born 1950) is Librarian and Archivist of Canada Emeritus.  A Canadian historian specialized in the study of Classical Antiquity, he served as Chair and Chief Executive Officer of Bibliothèque et Archives nationales du Québec from June 22, 2009 to June 21, 2014, and, from June 23, 2014 to August 29, 2019, he served as Librarian and Archivist of Canada.

Biography
A native of Montreal, he earned a doctorate from Université Paris VIII in 1976, following an M.A. degree from Université Laval (1973) and a B.A from UQAM (1972). His doctoral thesis, written under the supervision of Marcel Detienne, was published in 1982 under the title Les rôles du mágeiros. Étude sur la boucherie, la cuisine et le sacrifice dans la Grèce ancienne (Leiden and Montreal).

Starting in 1976, the first 20 years of his professional life were dedicated to research administration. After five years at Université de Montréal, he joined the Fonds FCAC (which eventually became the Fonds FCAR), a non-profit organization created by the Government of Québec in 1981. He founded the Scholarships department and subsequently headed the Research Support and Dissemination department.

In 1984, he joined Université du Québec à Montréal (UQAM) as Assistant Director, Research Services, a position he held until 1987 when he became Assistant to the Vice-Rector, Academic. During this period, Guy Berthiaume sat as a Member of the Executive Committee of the Canadian Association of University Research Administrators (CAURA), an association he chaired from 1989-1990. In 1989, he was named Vice-President of the UQAM Foundation, the university’s fundraising arm. Under his leadership, the Foundation raised more than 31 million dollars over the next seven years.

In 1996, he became a professor with UQAM’s History Department. He devoted the next two years to teaching Classical Antiquity. After spending a year at the helm of UQAM’s Office of Partnerships (1999), he was appointed in 2000 to serve as Director of the Canadian Students’ House at the Cité internationale universitaire de Paris. Over the next two years, he organized the festivities for the 75th anniversary of the House (October 2001) and edited the proceedings of a colloquium held on September 10, 2001 (La Cité internationale universitaire de Paris. 75 ans d'évolutions, Paris, 2002).

In 2002, he was recruited by Université de Montréal to become Vice-Rector and Chief of Staff to the Rector. In March 2003, he was appointed Vice-Rector, Development and Public Affairs, a position he continued to hold following the appointment of a new rector, in June 2005, with the title of Vice-Rector, Development and Alumni Relations.

August 2008 marked his return to Université du Québec à Montréal where he held the position of Vice-Rector, Research and Creation. In this capacity, he was responsible for the development of scientific and artistic activities at UQAM, as well as for international relations.

From June 22, 2009 to June 21, 2014, he was Chair and CEO of Bibliothèque et Archives nationales du Québec. This institution includes a major public library–the Grande Bibliothèque–,a preservation centre, and nine archives centres: Gatineau, Montréal, Québec, Rimouski, Rouyn-Noranda, Saguenay, Sept-Îles, Sherbrooke and Trois-Rivières, and a service point in Gaspé.

He became Librarian and Archivist of Canada on June 23, 2014 and retired on August 29, 2019.

From 2010 to 2014 he served as Secretary General of the Réseau francophone numérique (RFN), an organization that includes 22 heritage institutions from member countries of the Organisation internationale de la Francophonie (see: www.rfnum.org). Since May 2015, he has been sitting on the Executive Committee of RFN, as the representative of Library and Archives Canada.

Guy Berthiaume is a Knight in the Ordre des Palmes académiques of the French Republic (2006). He received the Dan Chase Award from the Canadian Association of University Research Administrators in 2000 and the medal of the Centre Jacques Cartier in 2007. He acted as a Trudeau Foundation Mentor in 2010-2011. In May 2012, he received the Prix Reconnaissance from UQAM and in December of the same year, he received the Queen Elizabeth II Diamond Jubilee Medal.

In April 2017, he was named Officier dans l'Ordre des Arts et des Lettres of the French Republic.  In May of the same year, he received the 2017 Canadian Association of Research Libraries' Award for Distinguished Service to Research Librarianship. In January, 2018, the Ontario Library Association gave him the OLA President's Award for Exceptional Achievement and, on May 6, 2019, he was recognized as a "Grand nom" of Collège Sainte-Marie by the Alumni Association of that Montreal School.  On November 5, 2020, he was awarded the IFLA medal for distinguished contribution to international librarianship by the International Federation of Library Associations and Institutions. In December of the same year he was appointed member of the Order of Canada

In 2015, he was elected Chair of the Standing Committee of National Libraries Section of IFLA for 2015-2019.  In September of the same year, he was appointed member of the Evaluation Commission of the International Council on Archives (ICA). On April 3, 2018, he was appointed North American Archival Network (NAANICA) representative on the Executive Board of ICA (2018-2020).

Dr. Berthiaume was awarded honorary doctorates from Université Jean Monnet, Saint-Étienne, France (November 2012), the University of Ottawa (June 2018) and Dalhousie University (June 2021) 

As Librarian and Archivist of Canada, he was an ex-officio member of the Historic Sites and Monuments Board of Canada.  On November 16, 2017 he was appointed to the Board of Directors of the Council on Library and Information Resources (CLIR); on November 8, 2018 he was elected Treasurer of CLIR. and on November 19, 2020 he was elected Vice-Chair of the Board.

He is a member of the Scientific Committee of the Mexican journal Bibliographica and he was appointed to the Editorial Board of the journal KULA: Knowledge Creation, Dissemination, and Preservation Studies (http://kula.uvic.ca/) and to the Board of Directors of Concordia University Press.

On August 30, 2019, he was appointed Scientific Adviser by the Fonds de recherche Société et culture of the Province of Quebec, and on November 1, 2019, he was appointed as Senior Fellow of the Centre for Professional Development of the National Library Board of Singapore for a two-year term.  On December 9, 2021, he was appointed member of the Scientific Council of the Bibliothèque nationale de France.

Berthiaume also acts as strategic advisor to Acfas and the Blue Metropolis Literary Festival. In addition, he chaired the Committee for the Revival of the Latin Quarter of Montréal from December 2021 to June 2022.  In December 2022, he was appointed to the Executive Committee of the Alumni Network of the Pierre Elliott Foundation.

Berthiaume was made a member of the Order of Canada in 2021.

References

Living people
1950 births
Université Laval alumni
Academic staff of the Université de Montréal
Academic staff of the Université du Québec à Montréal
Historians from Quebec
People from Montreal
French Quebecers
Université du Québec à Montréal alumni
Chevaliers of the Ordre des Palmes Académiques
Canadian archivists
Canadian university and college vice-presidents
20th-century Canadian historians
21st-century Canadian historians